Ashwini is a 1991 Telugu biographical sports drama film based on the life of Ashwini Nachappa, an Indian athlete who was a national champion sprinter. The film was produced by Ramoji Rao, and directed by B. C. Mouli. It was featured in the 15th IFFI' 92 Indian Panorama section.

Cast 
Ashwini Nachappa as Ashwini
Bhanu Chander as Prabhakar
Ramaraju as Joe

Soundtrack 

Soundtrack was composed by M. M. Keeravaani where all lyrics were written by Veturi.

Awards
Nandi Awards
 Third Best Feature Film - Bronze - Ramoji Rao

References

External links
 

Indian films based on actual events
Sports films based on actual events
Biographical films about sportspeople
Indian biographical drama films
Films scored by M. M. Keeravani
Indian sports drama films
Films shot in Delhi
1991 films
1990s Telugu-language films
1990s biographical drama films
Films shot in Hyderabad, India
Cultural depictions of track and field athletes
Cultural depictions of Indian men
1990s sports drama films
Films directed by T. S. B. K. Moulee
1991 drama films